USS Bittern may refer to the following ships of the United States Navy:

  was launched 15 February 1919 by Alabama Dry Dock and Shipbuilding Co., Mobile, Alabama.
 USS Bittern (AM-352) was laid down on 10 September 1943 at Portland, Oregon, by the Willamette Iron and Steel Corp.; named Bittern on 11 April 1944; and launched on 21 June 1944.  The cessation of hostilities, however, prompted the Navy to cancel the contract for her construction on 1 November 1945.
  was launched 4 March 1957 by Consolidated Shipbuilding Corp., City Island, New York

References 
 

United States Navy ship names